Holmengrå (historically: Holmengraa) may refer to the following:

Places
Holmengrå, Finnmark, a small fishing village in Sør-Varanger municipality, Troms og Finnmark county, Norway
Holmengrå, Østfold, a small island in Hvaler municipality in Viken county, Norway
Holmengrå, Vestland, a small island in Fedje municipality, Vestland county, Norway
Holmengrå Lighthouse, a lighthouse on the island of Holmengrå in Fedje municipality, Vestland county, Norway
Holmengrå, Sweden, a small island just west of Strömstad in Västra Götaland County, Sweden

Other
Battle of Holmengrå (in Hvaler), a battle during the Civil war era in Norway on 12 Nov 1139
 is the name of a Norwegian tanker which was sunk on 28 December 1944 in an Allied air strike during World War II

See also
Grey Island, originally called Holmen graa, in the South Orkney islands near Antarctica
Holmengråfjorden, a fjord that flows past Holmengrå in Sør-Varanger, Norway
Holmengråfjellet, a mountain to the north of Holmengrå in Sør-Varanger, Norway